Aileen Miranda Geving ( Sormunen; born February 13, 1987) is an American curler from Duluth, Minnesota. She represented the United States on the women's curling team at the 2018 Winter Olympics and earned her first national championship in 2020.

Career
Geving began curling in 1996. She was a national junior champion in 2004 and 2007.

Geving skipped a team at the 2005 United States Olympic Curling Trials and qualified for the playoffs in fourth place but lost her page playoffs game against Patti Lank. She also competed at the 2010 United States Olympic Curling Trials but finished outside of the playoffs in fifth place. She then played as third for Patti Lank at the 2010 United States Women's Curling Championship and finished as the runner-up to Erika Brown.

Geving skipped her own team at the 2011 and 2012 United States Women's Curling Championships, finishing sixth and fourth, respectively. She and her then-third Courtney George switched positions the next year and finished second at the 2013 United States Women's Curling Championship. Consequently, she and her team were selected to participate at the 2014 United States Olympic Curling Trials by the United States Curling Association's High Performance Program committee.

At the 2020 United States Women's Championship, Geving earned her first national title as lead for Tabitha Peterson. In the round-robin, Team Peterson's only loss came against Jamie Sinclair but they then beat Team Sinclair in the one vs. 2 page playoff game and again in the final.  As United States Champions Team Peterson would have represented the United States at the 2020 World Women's Curling Championship, but they lost that opportunity when the Championship was cancelled due to the COVID-19 pandemic. They also earned a spot at the final Grand Slam of the season, the Champions Cup, which was also cancelled due to the pandemic. Their qualification will instead carry over to the 2021 Champions Cup.

During the 2020 off-season, the team announced that Tabitha Peterson would remain as skip when Roth returned from maternity leave. Roth re-joined the team as vice-skip at third, with Hamilton moving to second, Tara Peterson to lead, and Geving to alternate. Due to the COVID-19 pandemic, the Peterson team did not compete in events for most of the 2020–21 season until entering a bio-secure bubble held in Calgary, Alberta in the spring of 2021 for three events in a row. The first two events were the Champions Cup and Players' Championship grand slams, with the team missing the playoffs at both. The third event in the Calgary bubble for Team Peterson was the 2021 World Women's Championship, in which they earned a spot as 2020 National Champions after the 2021 National Championship was moved to later in the spring due to the pandemic. They finished the 13-game round-robin in fifth place with a 7–6 record, earning them a spot in the playoffs and securing a 2022 Olympic berth for the United States. In the playoffs, Team Peterson defeated Denmark's Madeline Dupont but lost to Switzerland's Silvana Tirinzoni to end up in the bronze medal game. There, Peterson faced off against Sweden's Anna Hasselborg and won with a score of 9–5, including scoring five points in the seventh end. Team Peterson's bronze medal finish was the first World Women's medal for the United States in 15 years, and the first-ever bronze medal.

The Peterson rink won their first two events of the 2021–22 season, the US Open of Curling and the 2021 Curlers Corner Autumn Gold Curling Classic. The following week, they played in the 2021 Masters where they made it as far as the quarterfinals. The team then played in the 2021 United States Olympic Curling Trials, where they attempted to return to the Olympics. Through the round robin, the team posted a 9–1 record, putting them into the best-of-three final against Cory Christensen. The Peterson rink beat Christensen in two-straight games, booking their tickets to the 2022 Winter Olympics. After the Trials, the team played in one event before the Olympics, the Curl Mesabi Classic, which they won, beating Christensen again in the final. At the Olympics, the team finished the round robin with a 4–5 record, missing the playoffs. The team finished off the season by playing in two Slams, the 2022 Players' Championship and the 2022 Champions Cup, missing the playoffs in both events.

Personal life
Geving has a degree in organizational management from the University of Minnesota Duluth. She is currently an insurance commercial client executive. She is married to Garrett Geving, and has one daughter.

Teams

References

External links

1987 births
Living people
Sportspeople from Duluth, Minnesota
American female curlers
University of Minnesota Duluth alumni
Continental Cup of Curling participants
Curlers at the 2018 Winter Olympics
Olympic curlers of the United States
American curling champions
21st-century American women
Curlers at the 2022 Winter Olympics